José Erandi Bermúdez Méndez (born 15 March 1977) is a Mexican politician affiliated with the National Action Party. As of 2014 he served as Deputy of the LIX Legislature of the Mexican Congress representing Guanajuato.

References

1977 births
Living people
Politicians from Guanajuato
Members of the Chamber of Deputies (Mexico)
National Action Party (Mexico) politicians
People from Pénjamo
21st-century Mexican politicians